The 1860 United States presidential election in Kentucky took place on November 6, 1860, as part of the 1860 United States presidential election. Kentucky voters chose 12 representatives, or electors, to the Electoral College, who voted for president and vice president.

Kentucky was won by the Senator John Bell (CU–Tennessee), running with the Governor of Massachusetts Edward Everett, with 45.18% of the popular vote, against 14th Vice President of the United States John Breckenridge (SD–Kentucky), running with Senator Joseph Lane, with 36.35% of the popular vote and the 15th Senator Stephen A. Douglas (D–Illinois), running with 41st Governor of Georgia Herschel V. Johnson, with 17.54% of the popular vote.

Despite former representative Abraham Lincoln (R-Illinois) having been born and raised for the first five years of his life in Kentucky, he came in a distant fourth, failing to win 1% of the vote. Even worse, Lincoln failed to win LaRue County, the location of his birth. , this is the last election in which Clay County voted for a Democratic candidate.

Results

References

Kentucky
1860
1860 Kentucky elections